Sindhi Memon is a person of Memon community who resides in the Pakistani province of Sindh, they speak Sindhi as their first language.

Historical background
Unlike other Memons, Sindhi Memon remained in their own ancestral land, and now are spread in almost all districts of Sindh. Sindhi Memons are known for their prowess of doing business skillfully, though many Sindhi memons have also sought white collar jobs in govt: and private sectors.

Social welfare work
With the help of some Sindhi Memon philanthropists, a hospital project called Memon Medical Institute was launched in Karachi in 2003 and was planned to be completed by 2010.

Notable People
 Marvi Memon, Politician
 Sirajul Haq Memon Sindhi language writer, novelist
 Jan Muhammad A. Memon acadmecian
 Hussain Haroon, former ambassador of Pakistan to UN
 Sharjeel Memon; Politician
 Maria Memon, TV Journalist and Anchorperson

See also
 Memon people

References

Memon
Ethnic groups in Pakistan
Sindhi tribes
Social groups of Pakistan
Sindhi-language surnames
Pakistani names